An-Nisa 4:34 is the 34th verse in the fourth chapter of the Quran. This verse adjudges the role of a husband as protector and maintainer of his wife and how he should deal with disloyalty on her part. Scholars vastly differ on the implications of this verse, with many Muslim scholars arguing that it serves as a deterrent from anger-based domestic violence. The translation of the verse is also subject to debate among Muslim scholars, which can read 'strike them [wives]' or '(lightly) strike them' or 'beat them' or 'scourge them', depending on the translator. Furthermore, as that said in a hadith transmitted by Abu Huraira, slapping someone across their face was forbidden.

English translations 
Arthur John Arberry:

George Sale:

Marmaduke Pickthall:

Muhammad Taqi Usmani:
   

Dr. Mustafa Khattab:
   

Abdullah Yusuf Ali:

Sahih International, at Quran.com:

Ahmad Shafaat:

Muhsin Khan, at Quran.com:

Muhammad Tahir-ul-Qadri:

Laleh Bakhtiar, PhD:

Maulvi Sher Ali on behalf of the Ahmadiyya religion:

Edip Yüksel on behalf of Quranist school of thought:

Verse

Transliteration

Verses in context

Background of the verse 
There are a number of translations of this verse from the Arabic original, and all vary to some extent. Some Muslims, such as Islamic feminist groups, argue that Muslim men use the text as an excuse for domestic violence.

In Muhammad's farewell sermon as recorded in al-Tabari's History, and in a Sahih Hadith collected by Abu Dawud, he gave permission to husbands to hit their wives under certain circumstances without severity (فَاضْرِبُوهُنَّ ضَرْبًا غَيْرَ مُبَرِّحٍ fadribuhunna darban ghayra mubarrih; literal translation: "... then beat them, a beating without severity") When the cousin and companion of Muhammad, Ibn Abbas, replied back: “I asked Ibn Abbas: ‘What is the hitting that is 'without severity'?’ He replied [with] the siwak (tooth-stick) and the like’. Muhammad himself never hit a woman and forbade beating one's wife or striking her face.

Another hadith narration of the Farewell Sermon appears in Sunan Ibn Majah. The Arabic phrase mentioned above is here translated, "hit them, but without causing injury or leaving a mark."

There have been several fatwas against domestic violence. Feminist writers have argued that society during Quranic times differed from modern times, especially in how children were reared and raised, creating a need for gender roles. However, these scholars highlight that the Qur'an can be interpreted differently as society changes.

Jonathan A.C. Brown gives the wider scholarly tendency when it comes to the verse:

The first part of the verse about men having authority over women is meant for obedience towards God, not the husband.

Background on the roles of men and women in Islam

The Qur'an states that men are in charge of women because God has favored one over the other and they are responsible to provide them. Women, however, are given a degree of autonomy over their own income and property. Nevertheless, they are responsible for educating the children, as God has given the one preference over the other. Man is also considered to be the head of the family. The Qur'an recommends that wives be obedient and adaptable to their husbands. Wives should also keep the secrets of their husbands and protect their honor and integrity. Islamic scholars consider this important in running a smooth family system.

For both men and women, zulm- known in English as actions of 'cruelty' against someone- is explicitly prohibited.

Shared Treatment of genders throughout the Qur'an
The equality of men and women is discussed in many places throughout the text. 

The Qur'an is also very specific that both men and women should receive equal punishment for wrongdoings (24:2), and that God will give a believer who does a righteous deed, regardless of being male or female, Paradise (4:124).

Male and female relationships in the times of Muhammad

In her book Qur'an and Women, scholar Amina Wadud writes about the importance of women in the time of Muhammad.  During this time, women did not have access to the technology that women today have; giving birth and raising children was much more difficult due to diseases and lack of healthcare knowledge.  For this reason, Wadud writes, "The Qur'an establishes his [the husband's] responsibility as qiwamah: seeing to it that the women is not burdened with additional responsibilities which jeopardize that primary demanding responsibility only she can fulfill." The need to reproduce and raise children contributed to the importance of gender roles in the time of Muhammad.

Scholar Ayesha Chaudhry writes that many Muslims have this fundamentally flawed way of examining the text, writing that "Despite the potential for such verses [4:34] to have multiple plain-sense meanings, living Muslim communities place these interpretations in conversation with the pre-colonial Islamic tradition".

Examples from Muhammad
The late Ayatollah Sayyid Muhammad Hussein Tabataba'i (1903-1981 AD) provides the following exegesis on 4:34 from both Sunni and Shi'ite sources in his Mizan:Ibn Abi Hatim has narrated through Ash’ath ibn ‘Abdil-Malik from al-Hasan that he said: “A woman came to the Prophet complaining against her husband that he had slapped her. The Messenger of Allah said: “Retribution”. Then Allah revealed the verse, “Men are maintainers of women… (4:34); so the woman returned without retribution [ad-Durr 'l-munthur, as-Suyuti]. [as-Suyuti] has narrated it from the Prophet through other chains too.  Some of them say that the Messenger of Allah said: “I wanted one thing (retribution), but Allah decided otherwise"...there were some instances where Allah had amended some prophetic orders by adding to or deleting from it, but it was only in his administrative order, not in matters of the law ordained by him for his people, otherwise it would have been an invalid nullification...the Messenger of Allah used to wonder aloud: "How can you embrace the woman with a hand you had hit her with?".  It is narrated also in al-Kafi through his chain from Abu Maryam from Abu Ja’far (Imam Muhammad al-Baqir) that he said: “The Messenger of Allah said: “What! Does one of you hit his wife, and then attempt to embrace her?".  Countless such statements are found in the traditions; and one may understand from them the Islamic views on this subject.Al-Tabari (839-923 AD) wrote that, "The Prophet never raised his hand against one of his wives, or against a slave, nor against any person at all." In fact, when Muhammad faced rebellion of his wives, rather than beat them, Al-Tabari accounts that he instead, "stayed away from his wives for 29 nights."

Debates and discussion about the text
In response to nushûz, admonishment, leaving wives in their beds and idribihunna are permitted. Islamic scholars agree such actions can not be undertaken for any reason other than those mentioned in the Qur'an (see nushûz).

Authority of men
This allots men authority, qawwamun, over women conditional on men being responsible of earning income on behalf of for women and spending their property to support women i.e., 
clothing, residence, and sustenance.

Obedient or Qanitat
The verse commands women to be qanitat. Some commentators use the term to mean obedience to the husband, while others assert that it means obedience to God. Some scholars agree that the husband does not have absolute control over his wife, and her first loyalty is to God.

to admonish them 
The first response to nushuz is wā'z (‘وَعَظ’), meaning to first admonish or scold the wife of her behaviour. There is strong agreement amongst Muslim scholars that this admonishment must be conducted in a spirit of reconciliation.

to leave them alone in beds 

According to tafsir ibn kathir, a well known commentary of Quran. He describes in his exegesis.

{{quote|The Sunan and Musnad compilers recorded that Mu`awiyah bin Haydah Al-Qushayri said, "O Allah's Messenger! What is the right that the wife of one of us has on him The Prophet said to feed her when you eat, clothe her when you buy clothes for yourself, refrain from striking her face or cursing her, and to not abandon her, except in the house.}}

Should the nushuz continue, the next step is to refuse to share the bed with the wife. Again Muslim scholars emphasize on the spirit of healing while conducting this action.

to beat them (iḍribūhunna)
There are a number of translations of the original Arabic 4:34.

The term iḍribūhunna (usually translated, 'beat them') in 4:34 is the imperative form of the phrase ḍaraba (Arabic: ضرب  'to beat, beat, smote, or strike'). Scholars interpret iḍribūhunna in different ways. Whereas the consensus interprets it to mean "to strike", some hold that the term means "to separate". Such an action is to be administered only if neither the husband nor the wife are willing to divorce.
 
The term daraba is translated by Yusuf Ali as "beat," but the Arabic word is used elsewhere in the Qur'an to convey different meanings. The phrase, "Daraba Allah mathalan" translates to, "Allah gives or sets an example." The use of this word might be compared to the way "to strike" is used in English, which can mean, "to strike a pose," or "to strike a bargain," not just referring to the physical act of hitting something. The use of daraba is also intentional, because a different Arabic word exists, "daraba" which is translated to, "to strike repeatedly or intensely."

Muslim scholars who permit hitting, emphasize that it must not be harsh, but rather light."The Holy Qur'an: Text, Translation and Commentary", Abdullah Yusuf Ali, Amana Corporation, Brentwood, MD, 1989. , passage was quoted from commentary on 4:34M.A.S Abdel Haleem Understanding the Qur'an 46-54 Muslim men are never to hit their spouse's face, nor to hit them in such a way as would leave marks on their body. Scholars suggest that the response administered should be in proportion to the fault committed. Traditionally the idea of beating was "with a toothbrush" or "with a folded handkerchief." Jonathan A.C. Brown resumes the situation:If a wife exhibited egregious disobedience (nushuz) such as uncharacteristically insulting behavior, leaving the house against the husband's will and without a valid excuse or denying her husband sex (without medical grounds), the husband should first admonish her to be conscious of God and proper etiquette. If she did not desist from her behavior, he should cease sleeping with her in their bed. If she still continued in her nushuz, he should then strike her to teach her the error of her ways. Shaffii law only allowed the husband to use his hand or a wound-up handkerchief (mina malfuf), not a whip or stick. All schools of law prohibited striking the wife in the face or in any sensitive area likely to cause injury. All except some Maliki jurists held that the wife could claim compensation payment (diya) from the husband for any injury she sustained, and Hanbalis, the later Shaffii school as well as the Maliki school, allowed a judge to dissolve the marriage at no cost to the wife if harm had been done. In effect,  any physical harm was grounds for compensation and divorce since the Prophet had limited striking one's wife to 'a light blow that leaves no mark.' Causing any injury thus meant that a husband had exceeded his rights. All schools of law agreed that if the wife died due to a beating, her family could claim her wergild or possibly even have the husband executed.Many jurists interpret iḍribūhunna as "more or less symbolic."One such authority is the earliest hafiz, Ibn Abbas. Others, however, argue that a mere symbolic administration would be pointless and rather should be an "energetic demonstration" of the love of the husband. But it is agreed that the demonstration should not seriously hurt the wife.

The 2007 translation The Sublime Quran by Laleh Bakhtiar translates iḍribūhunna not as 'beat them' but as 'go away from them'. The introduction to her translation discusses the linguistic and shari‘ah reasons in Arabic for understanding this verb in context. Muhammad never beat his wives, and his example from the Sunnah informs the interpretation of this verse. This interpretation is supported by the fact that some other verses, such as 4:101 which contains word darabtum (derivation from daraba), demonstrate also the interpretation of Arabic word daraba to have meaning 'going' or 'moving'.

The Islamic scholar Tahir-ul-Qadri has given the same translation in his translation of the Quran "Irfan-ul-Quran": "(...)and (if they still do not improve) turn away from them, striking a temporary parting.(...)". This translation is further supported by the fact that the word "darabtum" is used in the same chapter (specifically, in ), which means to "go abroad" in the sake of Allah and which is derived from the same root word ("daraba") as "idribuhunna" in 4:34.

The book Woman in the Shade of Islam by Saudi scholar Abdul Rahman al-Sheha stated that a man may "beat" his wife only if it occurs without "hurting, breaking a bone, leaving blue or black marks on the body and avoiding hitting the face, at any cost."

A widely used 1930 English translation of the Quran by British Muslim scholar Marmaduke Pickthall determined the verse to mean that, as a last resort, men can "scourge" their wives.

Some jurists argue that even when hitting is acceptable under the Qur'an, it is still discountenanced.The medieval jurist ash-Shafi'i, founder of one of the main schools of fiqh, commented on this verse that "hitting is permitted, but not hitting is preferable."

In his book No god but God, University of Southern California scholar Reza Aslan, stated that false interpretations of the text have occurred because Quranic commentary "has been the exclusive domain of Muslim men."

The Islamic prophet Mohammed himself, according to Islamic tradition, never once struck a woman in argument. This fact is sometimes cited in debates about the text.

Muslim feminist writer Asra Q. Nomani has argued, Feminist writer Amina Wadud writes in her book, ''Inside the Gender Jihad: Women's Reform in Islam'':

Ibn Ishaq has said that Muhammad in his The Farewell Sermon said that:

Nada Ibrahim of the University of South Australia states that three words—qawwamuna, nushuzahunna, and wadribuhunna—are mistranslated due to the lack of equivalent English alternatives. She explains that in particular, English language Qur'an commentators have not agreed to merely one translation of the word wadribuhunna'' and that "A clear disagreement exists among English-language Qur’an commentators on how best to translate this word. All translations give an explicit negative connotation, and – when read out of context – further exacerbates any misunderstanding."

The keywords of Verse 34 of Surah An-Nisa come with various meanings, each of which enables us to know a distinct aspect, meaning and matter. Each aspect, i.e., meanings proposed by commentators, translators, and scholars throughout history for this verse, is according to a distinct wonted system of the family in history. "Zarb" does not mean assault or any form of violence against women. Rather, it means a practical action to inspire disobedient women to obey the legitimate rights of their spouse.

When they obey 
In the Quran’s Commentary exegesis of this part of verse is as following:

Glorification of God 
Ibn Kathir in the commentary of this part of verse says

See also
Islam and domestic violence
Criticism of the Qur'an
Women and Islam
Female figures in the Qur'an

References

External links 
Q4:34, 50+ translations, islamawakened.com
 Ghent University | Does Qur'anic verse 4:34 "allow a superior husband to beat his inferior, disobedient wife?"
The Sublime Quran: The misinterpretation of Chapter 4 Verse 34

 Exegesis by Ahmad Shafaat
 Comprehensive study of evidence FOR and AGAINST wife beating in Islam
QuranicPath | The Myth that Women have to "Obey" their Husbands (Analysis of 4:34)
QuranicPath | Collection of 4:34 Translations which do not use "beat/scourge/hit" (violence)

Quranic verses
Intimate partner violence
Women's rights in Islam
An-Nisa
Sharia